Bedřich Golombek (February 5, 1901 in Hrušov, today part of Ostrava – March 31, 1961 in Brno) was a Czech journalist and writer.

Golombek was born into the family of a coal miner. He studied at a secondary school in Ostrava, and immediately afterwards (in 1919) began work for the newspaper Lidové noviny, in the office in Brno. Golombek started as a reporter, since 1930 he was editor-in-chief of the Sunday edition, since 1933 editor-in-chief of the afternoon edition. After World War II he became the editor-in-chief at the main office of Lidové noviny in Prague but after Victorious February of 1948 (communist coup d'état) he was forced to leave. Later, he worked as a clerk in a factory in Brno.

Selected works
 Journalistic activity is the most valued and extensive legacy of Golombek.
 Together with Edvard Valenta Golombek recorded stories of Jan Welzl, a Czech traveller and Eskimo chief. The stories were serialized in the newspaper and later, during the 1930s, published in four books.
 Lidé na povrchu, 1941. A novel about Ostrava region.
 Dům o dvou poschodích, 1942. A novel about Ostrava region.
 Dnes a zítra. K padesátce Lidových novin, 1944. A recollection of the history of the newspaper.
 Co nebude v dějepise, 1945. Description of life during occupation.
 Rudolf Těsnohlídek, 1946. Biography of writer and journalist Rudolf Těsnohlídek.
 Perleťová květina, 1959. Collection of short stories.
 Čtení o veletrhu, posthumously in 1961. Depiction of the atmosphere of fair trades in Brno.

References 
 Short biography 

1901 births
1961 deaths
Writers from Ostrava
Czech journalists
Czech male writers
20th-century journalists